Qisas or Qiṣāṣ is an Islamic term interpreted to mean "retaliation in kind", "eye for an eye", or retributive justice. In classical/traditional Islamic law (sharia), the doctrine of qisas provides for a punishment analogous to the crime.

The principle of qisas in ancient societies meant that the person who committed a crime or the tribe he belonged to was punished in the same way as the crime committed. That is, an eye for an eye, a tooth for a tooth, an ear for an ear, and a life for a life. Since the principle of individual responsibility did not exist in ancient societies, someone else (such as his closest relative) could be punished instead of the criminal. Most time, it was ignored whether the act was a deliberate act, a life or blood cost was charged for each life.

The basis of this practice was that a member of the tribe to which the murderer belonged was handed over to the victim's family for execution, equivalent to the social status of the murdered person. The condition of social equivalence meant the execution of a member of the murderer's tribe who was equivalent to the murdered, in that the murdered person was male or female, slave or free, elite or commoner. For example, only one slave could be killed for a slave, and a woman for a woman. On this pre-Islamic understanding added a debate about whether a Muslim can be executed for a non-Muslim during the Islamic period.

The main verse for implementation in Islam is Al Baqara; 178 verse;
: Believers! Retaliation is ordained for you regarding the people who were killed. Free versus free, captive versus captive, woman versus woman. Whoever is forgiven by the brother of the slain for a price, let him abide by the custom and pay the price well."

Qisas is available to the victim or victim's heirs against a convicted perpetrator of murder or intentional bodily injury. In the case of murder, qisas gives the right to take the life of the killer, if the latter is convicted and the court approves. Those who are entitled to qisas have the option of receiving monetary compensation (diyya) or granting pardon to the perpetrator instead.

Qisas and diyya are two of several forms of punishment in classical/traditional Islamic criminal jurisprudence, the others being Hudud and Ta'zir. The legal systems of Iran, Pakistan, Saudi Arabia, United Arab Emirates, Qatar and some Nigerian states currently provide for qisas.

Islamic scriptures

 Quran 
The Qisas or equivalence verse in Quran is,

The Qur'an allows the aggrieved party to receive monetary compensation (blood money, diyya) instead of qisas, or forfeit the right of qiṣāṣ as an act of charity or in atonement for the victim family's past sins.

 Hadith 

The Hadiths have extensive discussion of qisas. For example, Sahih Bukhari states,

Many premodern Islamic scholars ruled -- based on hadith -- that when the victim was a non-Muslim dhimmi or a non-Muslim slave owned by a Muslim, only diya (blood money) and not qisas should be available as compensation.

History
A legal concept similar to Qisas is the principle of Eye for an eye first recorded in the Code of Hammurabi.

The principle of retaliation in ancient societies meant that, the person who committed a crime or the tribe he belonged to would be punished in the same way as the crime committed. That is, an eye for an eye, a tooth for a tooth, an ear for an ear, and a life for a life. Since the principle of individual responsibility did not exist in ancient societies, someone else, such as his closest relative, could be punished instead of the criminal. Most of the time, no matter whether the killing was intentional or not, a life was taken for every life or blood price''' (Diyya) was paid.

Traditional jurisprudence

Classical/traditional Islamic jurisprudence (fiqh) treats homicide as a civil dispute between victim and perpetrator, rather than an act requiring corrective punishment by the state to maintain order. In all cases of murder, unintentional homicide, bodily injury and property damage, under classical/traditional Islamic law, the prosecutor is not the state, but only the victim or the victim's heir (or owner, in the case when the victim is a slave). Qisas can only be demanded by the victim or victim's heirs.

Differences in treatment according to religion and status of victim

In the early history of Islam, there were considerable disagreements in Muslim judicial opinions on applicability of Qisas and Diyya when a Muslim murdered a non-Muslim (Dhimmi, Musta'min or slave).Tahir Wasti (2009), The Application of Islamic Criminal Law in Pakistan: Sharia in Practice, Brill, pp. 89-90 (In yet another class were murdered apostates from and blasphemers of Islam, non-Muslims who refused to accept dhimmi status, etc.)

According to classical jurists of three of the four Sunni Islamic schools of jurisprudence -- Shafi'i, Maliki and Hanbali schools -- qisas is available only when the victim is Muslim;  while the Hanafi school holds it may apply in some circumstances when a Muslim has done harm to a non-Muslim.Rudolph Peters and Peri Bearman (2014), The Ashgate Research Companion to Islamic Law, pp. 169-170

Jurists agree neither Qisas nor any other form of compensation applied in cases where the victim is 
an apostate (converted from Islam to another religion), 
a person who has committed the hadd crime of transgression against Islam or Imam (baghy), or 
a non-Muslim who did not accept himself or herself as a Dhimmi, or 
if the non-Muslim victim's family could not prove that the victim used to pay Jizya.Richard Terrill (2012), World Criminal Justice Systems: A Comparative Survey, Routledge, pp. 554-562

Numerous Hanafi, Shafi'i and Maliki jurists stated that a Muslim and a non-Muslim are neither equal nor of same status under sharia, and thus the judicial process and punishment applicable must vary.
This was justified by the hadith:

Hanafi
The Hanafi school ordains lesser-than-murder qisas across religions, whether the perpetrator is Muslim or non-Muslim, according to Sayyid Sabiq's Fiqh Sunnah. 
Most Hanafi scholars ruled that, if a Muslim killed a dhimmi or a slave, Qisas (retaliation) was applicable against the Muslim, but this could be averted by paying a Diyya.Rudolph Peters and Peri Bearman (2014), The Ashgate Research Companion to Islamic Law, pp. 129-137 In one case, the Hanafi jurist Abu Yusuf initially ordered Qisas when a Muslim killed a dhimmi, but under Caliph Harun al-Rashid's pressure replaced the order with Diyya if the victim's family members were unable to prove the victim was paying jizya willingly as a dhimmi. According to Fatawa-e-Alamgiri, a 17th-century compilation of Hanafi fiqh in South Asia, a master who kills his slave should not face capital punishment under the retaliation doctrine.

If a Muslim or a dhimmi killed a Musta'min (foreigner visiting) who did not enjoy permanent protection in Dar al-Islam and might take up arms against Muslims after returning to his homeland (dar al-harb),  neither Qisas nor Diyya applied against  the Musta'min's murderer according to Hanafi fiqh according to Yohanan Friedmann.

Non-Hanafi 
Non-Hanafi jurists have historically ruled that Qisas does not apply against a Muslim, if he murders any non-Muslim (including dhimmi) or a slave for any reason. Instead, the schools impose Diyya on the perpetrator.

Both Shafi'i and Maliki fiqh doctrines maintained that the Qisas only applies when there is "the element of equality between the perpetrator and the victim", according to scholar Yohanan Friedmann. Since "equality does not exist between a Muslim and an infidel, [because] Muslims are exalted above the infidels", Qisas is not available to an infidel victim when the crime's perpetrator is a Muslim.

In Shafi'i fiqh, this inequality was also expressed in Diyya compensation payment to the heirs of a dhimmi victim's which should be a third of what would be due in case the victim was a Muslim. In Maliki fiqh, compensation for a non-Muslim in the case of unintentional killing, bodily or property damage should be half of what would be due for an equivalent damage to a Muslim.

Maliki fiqh does made an exception to the ban on applying Qisas against a Muslim when their victim is a dhimmi in cases where the murder of the dhimmi is treacherous in nature.  

According to Hanbali legal school, if a Muslim kills or harms a non-Muslim, even if intentionally, Qisas does not apply, and the sharia court may only impose a Diyya (monetary compensation) with or without a prison term on the Muslim at its discretion. 

Current practiceQiṣāṣ is currently provided for by legal systems of several countries which apply classical/traditional Islamic jurisprudence (Saudi Arabia) or have enacted qisas laws as part of modern legal reforms.

Iran
Iran's penal code includes Qisas  as a method of punishment, spelled out in sections 1 through 80 of the code.Islamic Penal Code of the Islamic Republic of Iran , Book 3 The penal code outlines two types of Qisas crime - Qisas for when a life has been lost, and Qisas when a part of a human body has been lost. In cases of qisas for life, the victim's family may with the permission of court, take the life of the murderer. In cases of qisas for part of a human body, section 55 of Iran's penal code grants the victim or victim's family to inflict an equal injury to the perpetrator's body, provided they are given permission by the court. (The code also spells out what to do in different circumstances. If the victim lost the right hand and perpetrator does not have a right hand for qisas, for example, then with court's permission, the victim may cut the left hand of the perpetrator.)

In one episode, qiṣāṣ was demanded by Ameneh Bahrami, an Iranian woman blinded in an acid attack. She demanded that her attacker Majiv Movahedi be blinded as well. In 2011, Bahrami retracted her demand on the day the sentence was to be carried out, requesting instead that her attacker be pardoned.

A prisoner lodged in the Gohardasht Prison of the city of Karaj, was reported to have been blinded in March 2015 after being convicted for an acid attack on another man in 2009 and sentenced to the punishment under "qisas".  

Cases where qisas has been sentenced as a punishment, but the sentence not (as of November 2021) yet carried out, include: 
the October 2021 sentencing a 45-year-old man to forced blinding by a Criminal Court in Tehran after his neighbor lost his right eye as a result of a fight with the man in June 2018; 
the February 2021 sentencing to amputation (and other punishment) of a man in Chaharmahal and Bakhtiari province in southwestern Iran, as a result of injuring a state environmental agent; 
the May 2020 sentence of blinding in both eyes of a 30-year-old woman in northeastern Iran who had blinded a man by throwing acid in his face.

Pakistan
Pakistan introduced Qisas and Diyat in 1990 as Criminal Law (Second Amendment) Ordinance, after the Shariat Appellate Bench of the Supreme Court of Pakistan declared that the lack of Qisas and Diyat were repugnant to the injunctions of Islam as laid down by the Quran and Sunnah. Pakistani parliament enacted the law of Qisas and Diyat as Criminal Law (Amendment) Act, 1997. An offender may still be punished despite pardoning by way of ta'zīr or if not all the persons entitled to Qisas joined in the compromise. The Pakistan Penal Code modernized the Hanafi doctrine of qisas and diya by eliminating distinctions between Muslims and non-Muslims.

Nigeria
Since the 1960s, several northern states of Nigeria have enacted sharia-based criminal laws, including provisions for Qisas. These codes have been applied in the Sharia Courts of Nigeria to Muslims. Many have been sentenced to retaliation under the Qisas principle, as well as to other punishments such as hudud and tazir.I.K. Oraegbunam (2012), Penal Jurisprudence under Islamic Criminal Justice: Implications for the Right to Human Dignity in Nigerian Constitution, Journal Islamic State Practices in Int'l Law, 8, pp. 31-49

Saudi Arabia
Murder and manslaughter are private offenses in Saudi Arabia, which a victim or victim's heirs must prosecute, or accept monetary compensation, or grant pardon. The sharia courts in Saudi Arabia apply Qisas to juvenile cases, with previous limit of 7 year raised to 12 year age limit, for both boys or girls. This age limit is not effectively enforced, and the court can assess a child defendant's physical characteristics to decide if he or she should be tried as an adult. In most cases, a person who satisfies at least one of the following four characteristics is considered as an adult for Qisas cases: (1) above the age of 15, (2) has wet dreams (al-ihtilam''), (3) any appearance of pubic hair, or (4) start of menstruation. Qisas principle, when enforced in Saudi Arabia, means equal retaliation and damage on the defendant.

According to reports in Saudi media, in 2013, a court in Saudi Arabia sentenced a defendant to have his spinal cord severed to paralyze him, unless he paid one million Saudi riyals (about US$270,000) in Diyya compensation to the victim. The offender allegedly stabbed his friend in the back, rendering him paralysed from the waist down in or around 2003. Other reported sentences of qisas in KSA have included eye gouging, tooth extraction, and death in cases of murder.

Qisas and honor crimes

According to most variations of Islamic Law, Qisas doesn't apply if a Muslim parent or grandparent kills their child or grandchild, or if the murder victim is a spouse with whom one has surviving children. The culprit can be, however, subject to Diyya (financial compensation) which is payable to the surviving heirs of the victims or punished through Tazir which is a Fixed punishment given by the Judge or Ruler. 

The four major schools of Sunni Sharia have been divided on applicability of Qisas when the victim is a child, and the father is the murderer. The Hanafi, Shafi'i and Hanbali Sunni sharias have ruled that Qisas does not apply, as has the Shia Sharia doctrine. The Maliki school, however, has ruled that Qisas may be demanded by the mother if a father kills his son. The Hanafi, Hanbali and Shafi'i sharia extend this principle to cases when the victim is a child and the mother or grandparents are the murderers.

Some suggest that this exemption of parents and relatives from Qisas, and the treatment of homicide-related Qisas as a civil dispute that should be handled privately by victim's family under sharia doctrine, encourages honor crimes, particularly against females, as well as allows the murderer(s) to go unpunished. This, state Devers and Bacon, is why many honor crimes are not reported to the police, nor handled in the public arena. However, if the killer was proven to have accused the victim of adultery, a false accusation of rape case can be raised and the sentence carried out.  Furthermore, relations between the Islamic law and honor killing might be somewhat off since the tradition of honor killings also occurs and encouraged in non-Muslim world, even the Western one. Historically, Sharia did not stipulate any capital punishment against the accused when the victim is the child of the murderer, but in modern times some Sharia-based Muslim countries have introduced laws that grant courts the discretion to impose imprisonment of the murderer. However, the victim's heirs have the right to waive Qisas, seek Diyat, or pardon the killer.

See also 
Sabr
Sharia
 Hudud
 Tazir
 Diyya
 Application of sharia law by country

References 

Arabic words and phrases in Sharia
Islamic terminology
Islamic criminal jurisprudence
Punishments in religion
Islam and violence
Islam and capital punishment
Sharia legal terminology